Hylaeogena is a genus of beetles in the family Buprestidae, containing the following species:

 Hylaeogena achardi Obenberger, 1925
 Hylaeogena aeneonitens Hornburg, 2012
 Hylaeogena affinis Obenberger, 1923
 Hylaeogena alia Bellamy, 1998
 Hylaeogena alibertiae Fisher, 1930
 Hylaeogena alvarengai Cobos, 1967
 Hylaeogena anniae Obenberger, 1932
 Hylaeogena astraea (Waterhouse, 1889)
 Hylaeogena atroviridis (Fisher, 1922)
 Hylaeogena aurata Obenberger, 1925
 Hylaeogena aurocephala Cobos, 1967
 Hylaeogena aurulenta Cobos, 1959
 Hylaeogena benardi Obenberger, 1932
 Hylaeogena berlandi Obenberger, 1932
 Hylaeogena bicolor Apt, 1954
 Hylaeogena bordoni Cobos, 1967
 Hylaeogena bruchi (Kerremans, 1903)
 Hylaeogena bryanti Théry, 1940
 Hylaeogena carbo (Kirsch, 1866)
 Hylaeogena centralis (Waterhouse, 1889)
 Hylaeogena chopardi Obenberger, 1932
 Hylaeogena chrysocephala (Kerremans, 1896)
 Hylaeogena cincta (Waterhouse, 1889)
 Hylaeogena circularis (Kerremans, 1899)
 Hylaeogena circumciliata Cobos, 1967
 Hylaeogena circumcripta (Kerremans, 1903)
 Hylaeogena coelicolor Obenberger, 1925
 Hylaeogena cognata (Kirsch, 1873)
 Hylaeogena compacta (Waterhouse, 1889)
 Hylaeogena compar (Kirsch, 1873)
 Hylaeogena confusa Cobos, 1958
 Hylaeogena congnathoides Cobos, 1969
 Hylaeogena constans (Waterhouse, 1889)
 Hylaeogena cordieri Obenberger, 1923
 Hylaeogena curtula (Boheman, 1858)
 Hylaeogena cyaneoaurata Cobos, 1956
 Hylaeogena diabolica Cobos, 1959
 Hylaeogena dilatata (Gory, 1841)
 Hylaeogena discoidalis (Waterhouse, 1889)
 Hylaeogena dormitzeri Obenberger, 1925
 Hylaeogena elliptica Obenberger, 1925
 Hylaeogena ephippia (Fabricius, 1801)
 Hylaeogena episcopalis Obenberger, 1925
 Hylaeogena festiva (Fisher, 1922)
 Hylaeogena gratiosula Obenberger, 1925
 Hylaeogena grossei Obenberger, 1938
 Hylaeogena grouvellei Théry, 1934
 Hylaeogena gyoerfii Apt, 1954
 Hylaeogena helferi Obenberger, 1925
 Hylaeogena hydroporoides (Waterhouse, 1889)
 Hylaeogena insidiosa Cobos, 1978
 Hylaeogena iridea Apt, 1954
 Hylaeogena jeanneli Obenberger, 1932
 Hylaeogena joukli Obenberger, 1925
 Hylaeogena jousselinii (Gory, 1841)
 Hylaeogena jureceki Obenberger, 1941
 Hylaeogena kirschi Obenberger, 1925
 Hylaeogena klapaleki Obenberger, 1925
 Hylaeogena laenis (Gory, 1841)
 Hylaeogena lata (Kirsch, 1873)
 Hylaeogena laticeps (Waterhouse, 1889)
 Hylaeogena lecerfi Obenberger, 1932
 Hylaeogena lesnei Obenberger, 1932
 Hylaeogena lunifer (Waterhouse, 1889)
 Hylaeogena mariae Cobos, 1990
 Hylaeogena mequignoni Obenberger, 1932
 Hylaeogena metallica (Gory, 1841)
 Hylaeogena metzi Obenberger, 1925
 Hylaeogena micromegas Obenberger, 1925
 Hylaeogena modesta (Waterhouse, 1889)
 Hylaeogena nana (Kirsch, 1873)
 Hylaeogena nickerli Obenberger, 1925
 Hylaeogena nigerrima (Kerremans, 1903)
 Hylaeogena nigromicans Cobos, 1967
 Hylaeogena ogloblini Obenberger, 1932
 Hylaeogena onorei Cobos, 1990
 Hylaeogena opaca Cobos, 1978
 Hylaeogena ovalis (Waterhouse, 1889)
 Hylaeogena ovoidea Obenberger, 1925
 Hylaeogena ovulum Obenberger, 1925
 Hylaeogena paraguayensis Obenberger, 1923
 Hylaeogena pauligena Obenberger, 1925
 Hylaeogena pauperula (Thomson, 1879)
 Hylaeogena pilosa (Fisher, 1922)
 Hylaeogena planifrons (Kirsch, 1873)
 Hylaeogena rotundipennis (Fisher, 1922)
 Hylaeogena rugifrons Cobos, 1967
 Hylaeogena scutellaris Obenberger, 1925
 Hylaeogena seguyi Obenberger, 1932
 Hylaeogena semenovi Obenberger, 1932
 Hylaeogena semilunaris (Kerremans, 1900)
 Hylaeogena sepulchralis Obenberger, 1925
 Hylaeogena silverioi Cobos, 1956
 Hylaeogena sororcula Obenberger, 1932
 Hylaeogena speculum (Klug, 1825)
 Hylaeogena splendida Apt, 1954
 Hylaeogena submetallica Cobos, 1967
 Hylaeogena szekessyi Apt, 1954
 Hylaeogena tesari Obenberger, 1938
 Hylaeogena testudinaria (Gory, 1841)
 Hylaeogena tristis Cobos, 1956
 Hylaeogena unicolor (Kerremans, 1896)
 Hylaeogena venezuela Bellamy, 1996
 Hylaeogena viridifrons Cobos, 1967
 Hylaeogena zoufali Obenberger, 1925

References

Buprestidae genera